The Tehran International Auto Show is an annual auto show that takes place at Shahr-e- Aftab International Exhibition Center, Tehran, Iran. The show attracts many major car manufactures, luxury-tuning companies and other related companies, including super car manufacturers.

References

External links 

 
 Profile of the TEHRAN AUTO SHOW 2019

Auto shows in Iran
Events in Tehran
Automotive industry in Iran